Stephen Power (born 7 October 1950) is a former Australian rules footballer who played with Footscray in the Victorian Football League (VFL).

Power was a utility, seen mostly on the wing or half back flanks.

The St Kevin's College recruit could also play as a key defender and was a regular fixture in the Footscray team throughout the 1970s.

He finished second, behind Gary Dempsey, in Footscray's 1974 best and fairest awards.

References

1950 births
Australian rules footballers from Victoria (Australia)
Western Bulldogs players
Living people